Lauren Cornell is an American curator and writer based in New York. Cornell is the Director of the Graduate Program at the Center for Curatorial Studies, Bard College, and Chief Curator of the Hessel Museum of Art. Previously, she worked at the New Museum for twelve years and was the Executive Director of their affiliate Rhizome (2005-2012).

Biography
Cornell was born and raised in New York City. She started her career in the arts as the Executive Director of Ocularis, a now-closed cinema in Brooklyn, New York. 

She joined the New Museum in 2005, where she worked on the inaugural Generational show, Younger Than Jesus, and became the Executive Director of Rhizome, an organization that commissions, exhibits, and preserves art engaged with technology. Cornell curated Free, her first major exhibition for the New Museum in October 2010. Before stepping down as director of Rhizome, Cornell promoted discussion around the decentralization of new media art on the internet. After seven years at Rhizome, she stepped down as its director to serve as a full-time curator at The New Museum in 2012. 

She stepped down from her role at Rhizome in July 2012 to curate the New Museum's third Generational Triennial, Surround Audience, in 2015.

Cornell and Ed Halter co-edited the anthology Mass Effect: Art and the Internet in the Twenty-First Century (2016).

She has contributed to publications including Aperture, Art in America, ArtReview, Frieze, and Mousse, and written on artists for monographic catalogues.

In 2016, Artsy named Cornell one of "The 20 Most Influential Young Curators in the United States." In 2017, Cornell was the recipient of ArtTable's New Leadership Award. In 2017, she was named an Apollo 40 under 40.

Seven on Seven conference 
In 2010, Cornell co-founded Rhizome's Seven on Seven conference with Fred Benenson, John Borthwick, and Peter Rojas. The conference  bridges contemporary art and technology fields by pairing technological innovators with visual artists and challenging them to develop something over the course of a day. Seven on Seven was inspired by Experiments in Art and Technology (E.A.T.), a project launched by Billy Klüver and Robert Rauschenberg in 1967, which organized collaborations between artists and engineers at Bell Labs.

Exhibitions
 Young-Hae Chang Heavy Industries Black on White, Gray Ascending, December 2007 – March 2008 (co-curated with Laura Hoptman)
 New Museum Triennial: Younger Than Jesus, April–July 2009 (co-curated with Massimiliano Gioni and Laura Hoptman)
 Free, October 2010-January 2011
 Walking Drifting Dragging, January–February 2013
 New Museum Triennial: Surround Audience, February–May 2015 (co-curated with Ryan Trecartin)
 Song, Strategy, Sign: Beatriz Santiago Munoz (co-curated with Johanna Burton and Sara O’Keeffe)
 Invisible Adversaries at CCS Bard, June–September 2016 (co-curated with Tom Eccles)
 Daniel Steegmann Mangrané: A Transparent Leaf Instead of the Mouth at CCS Bard 
 Nil Yalter: Exile is a Hard Job at CCS Bard 
 Leidy Churchman: Crocodile at CCS Bard 
 Sky Hopinka: Centers of Somewhere at CCS Bard 
 Dara Birnbaum: Reaction at CCS Bard 
 Martine Syms: Grio College at CCS Bard

Selected writings 

 The Intensity and Integrity of Ian White, Frieze 
 Mass Effect, Mousse Magazine   
 Self-Portraiture in the First-Person Age, Aperture 
 In the Studio: Dara Birnbaum, Art in America 
 Techno-animism, Mousse Magazine 
 Down the Line, Frieze 
 If the Future Were Now: A.K. Burns, Mousse Magazine 
 On Club Internet, Mousse Magazine

Publications 
 Cornell, Lauren, Massimiliano Gioni, and Laura Hoptman, eds. Younger Than Jesus: The Reader. New York: New Museum / London: Steidl & Partners, 2009.
 Cornell, Lauren, ed., Free. New York/New Museum, 2010.
 Cornell, Lauren and Helga Christoffersen, eds. 2015 Triennial: Surround Audience. New York: New Museum / Rizzoli Skira, 2015.
 Cornell, Lauren and Ed Halter, eds. Mass Effect: Art and the Internet in the 21st Century. New York: New Museum / Cambridge, MA: the MIT Press, 2015.
 Cornell, Lauren and Eccles, Tom, eds. Invisible Adversaries. New York: Hessel Museum, 2016. 
 Cornell, Lauren, Karen Kelly, and Barbara Schroeder, eds., Leidy Churchman: Crocodile. New York: Hessel Museum / CCS Bard, 2019. 
 Cornell, Lauren, Elizabeth Chodos, and Barbara Schroeder, eds., Dara Birnbaum: Reaction. New York: Hessel Museum / CCS Bard, 2022.

References

Living people
American art curators
American women curators
People from New York City
Year of birth missing (living people)
21st-century American women